WBPW (96.9 FM), branded as "Big Country 96.9", is an American radio station in Presque Isle, Maine. It is a country music-formatted station and is owned by Townsquare Media. The station carries NASCAR races from the Motor Racing Network.

Former logos

External links

BPW
Country radio stations in the United States
Presque Isle, Maine
Radio stations established in 1973
1973 establishments in Maine
Townsquare Media radio stations